Liam Paul Ansell (born 12 November 1993) is an English field hockey player who plays as a forward for  Wimbledon and the England and Great Britain national teams.

Club career
Ansell plays club hockey in the Men's England Hockey League Premier Division for Wimbledon.

He has also played for  East Grinstead, Surbiton, Dutch Club Den Bosch, Sheffield Hallam, Richmond and Wycombe.

References

External links
 Liam Ansell at England Hockey
 Liam Ansell at Great Britain Hockey
 
 
 
 

1993 births
Living people
English male field hockey players
Commonwealth Games medallists in field hockey
Commonwealth Games bronze medallists for England
Field hockey players at the 2018 Commonwealth Games
2018 Men's Hockey World Cup players
Surbiton Hockey Club players
East Grinstead Hockey Club players
Wimbledon Hockey Club players
Men's England Hockey League players
Male field hockey forwards
HC Den Bosch players
Men's Hoofdklasse Hockey players
Field hockey players at the 2020 Summer Olympics
Olympic field hockey players of Great Britain
Sportspeople from High Wycombe
2023 Men's FIH Hockey World Cup players
Medallists at the 2018 Commonwealth Games